Sise is a surname. Notable people with the surname include:

Joe Sise (born 1989), Swedish footballer

See also
Sisse
Size (disambiguation)